Immemorial  may refer to:
 Time immemorial
 Immemorial nobility